Christopher Donald McVey (born 12 April 1997) is a Swedish footballer who plays as a right back for Major League Soccer club Inter Miami.

Club career
McVey started his career as a youth player at Sparsörs AIK and later joined IF Elfsborg at the age of 12 and its A-team in 2017.

On 4 March 2019, McVey joined Superettan side Dalkurd on loan until 15 July 2019.

On 14 January 2022, McVey signed a three-year deal with Major League Soccer club Inter Miami.

International career
In 2014, McVey played for the Sweden national under-17 team.

Personal life 
He holds an American passport and a Swedish passport.

References

External links
 
 
 

Swedish footballers
1997 births
Living people
Association football defenders
Allsvenskan players
Superettan players
IF Elfsborg players
Dalkurd FF players
Inter Miami CF players
Swedish expatriate footballers
Swedish expatriate sportspeople in the United States
Expatriate soccer players in the United States
Swedish people of American descent
Swedish people of Scottish descent
Major League Soccer players